This article lists events from the year 2003 in The Bahamas.

Incumbents 
 Monarch: Elizabeth II
 Governor-General: Dame Ivy Dumont
 Prime Minister: Perry Christie

Events

September
 September 3 -Tropical Storm Henri hits the Bahamas

Deaths

See also
List of years in the Bahamas

References

Links

 
2000s in the Bahamas
Years of the 21st century in the Bahamas
Bahamas
Bahamas